In mathematics, the irrational base discrete weighted transform (IBDWT) is a variant of the fast Fourier transform using an irrational base; it was developed by Richard Crandall (Reed College), Barry Fagin (Dartmouth College) and Joshua Doenias (NeXT Software) in the early 1990s using Mathematica.

The IBDWT is used in the Great Internet Mersenne Prime Search's client Prime95 to perform FFT multiplication, as well as in other programs implementing Lucas-Lehmer test, such as CUDALucas and Glucas.

References 

 Richard Crandall, Barry Fagin: Discrete weighted transforms and large-integer arithmetic, Mathematics of Computation 62, 205, 305-324, January 1994 (PDF file)
 Richard Crandall: Topics in Advanced Scientific Computation, TELOS/Springer-Verlag

FFT algorithms
Discrete transforms